German submarine U-577 was a Type VIIC U-boat built for Nazi Germany's Kriegsmarine for service during World War II.
She was laid down on 1 August 1940 by Blohm & Voss, Hamburg as yard number 553, launched on 15 May 1941 and commissioned on 3 July 1941 under Kapitänleutnant Herbert Schauenburg.

Design
German Type VIIC submarines were preceded by the shorter Type VIIB submarines. U-577 had a displacement of  when at the surface and  while submerged. She had two shafts and two  propellers.

U-577 was fitted with five  torpedo tubes (four fitted at the bow and one at the stern), fourteen torpedoes, one  SK C/35 naval gun, 220 rounds, and a  C/30 anti-aircraft gun. The boat had a complement of between forty-four and sixty.

Service history
The boat's career began with training at 7th U-boat Flotilla on 3 July 1941, followed by active service on 1 October 1941 as part of the 1st Flotilla. On 1 January 1942, she transferred to operations in the Mediterranean with 29th Flotilla, and was sunk just two weeks later.

In 3 patrols she sank no ships.

Wolfpacks
U-577 took part in three wolfpacks, namely:
 Stosstrupp (30 October – 1 November 1941)
 Raubritter (1 – 8 November 1941)
 Störtebecker (17 – 22 November 1941)

Fate
U-577 was sunk on 15 January 1942 in the Mediterranean NW of Mersa Matruh, in position , by depth charges from RN Swordfish from 815 Squadron. All hands were lost.

See also
 Mediterranean U-boat Campaign (World War II)

References

Bibliography

External links

German Type VIIC submarines
1941 ships
U-boats commissioned in 1941
Ships lost with all hands
U-boats sunk in 1942
U-boats sunk by depth charges
U-boats sunk by British aircraft
World War II shipwrecks in the Mediterranean Sea
World War II submarines of Germany
Ships built in Hamburg
Maritime incidents in January 1942